Mountain Spring is a spring in the Jacumba Mountains, in Imperial County, California. It is located at an elevation  near the head of In-Ko-Pah Gorge and the source of Myer Creek.

History
Mountain Spring was water source for the Mountain Spring Stage Station on the road that ran between San Diego and Yuma, Arizona from 1863.

References

Springs of Imperial County, California